Hot Shot is the debut studio album by American singer Karen Young. It was released on 1978 by Altra Moda Music. The album features two disco hits all written, produced and arranged by Andrew Kahn and Kurt Borusiewicz; the title track, "Bring On the Boys" and "Baby You Ain't Nothing Without Me".

Track listing 
"Hot Shot" - 8:40
"God Knows I'm Just a Woman" - 4:25
"Beau" - 4:03
"Bring on the Boys" - 5:40
"Where Is He" - 6:00
"Baby You Ain't Nothing Without Me" - 6:50

Charts

Singles

Personnel 
    Backing Vocals: Brian Phipps, Karen Dempsey, Karen Hawkins, Karla Garrison, Lorenzo Wright, Sonia Lonon, Steve West, Willie Mae Kidd "Sasha"*
    Bass: Vince Fay
    Cello – Larry Gold, Paul Eves
    Clarinet, Saxophone: Larry McKenna, Mike Pedicin, Ron Kerber
    Congas, Drums: Daryl Burgee
    Design [Jacket, Logo]: Peter Davis
    Engineer: Andrew Kahn, Kurt Borusiewicz, Larry Lynch, Lorenzo Wright, Wally Hayman, Walter Kahn
    Executive Producer: Walter Kahn
    Guitar: Lorenzo Wright
    Handclaps: Andrew Kahn, Chris Tortu, Darryl Adderley, Karen Young, Kurt Borusiewicz, Robert P. Brown, Sonia Lonon, Troy Dougherty, Willie Mae Kidd
    Maracas: Troy Dougherty
    Mastered By: David Moyssiadis
    Mixed By [Assistant]: Billy Kennedy, Frank Sestito, Troy Dougherty, Valeria Luzi, Wayne Gettman
    Percussion: Sahaba Daku
    Photography By [Cover]: Stephen Murri
    Piano, Electric Piano [Rhodes]: Andrew Kahn
    Producer, Arranged By: Andrew Kahn, Kurt Borusiewicz
    Tambourine: Dennis "Hollywood" McTigue, John Anderson
    Timbales: Ted Dormoi
    Trombone: Ed Cascarella, Lee Southall, Roger DeLillo
    Trumpet: Evan Solot, Jack Wilson, Richard Posmontier, Bob Hartzell
    Viola: Tony Sinagoga, Davis Barnett
    Violin: Wm. Mungiole, Charles Apollonia, Charles Parker, Chris Reeves, Don Renaldo, Gov Hutchinson, Joe Bonaccorso, Lenore Wolaniuk, Rudy Malizia

Credits 
 Recorded & mixed at Queen Village Recordings Studios, Philadelphia, PA.
 Mastered at Frankford/Wayne Recording Labs, Philadelphia, Pa.
 Engineer:Andrew Kahn, Kurt Borusiewicz, Larry Bynch, Lorenzo Wright, Wally Hayman, Walter Kahn
 Executive Producer: Walter Kahn
 Mixed By [Assistant]: Billy Kennedy, Frank Sestito, Troy Dougherty, Valeria Luzi, Wayne Gettman
 Producer: Andrew Kahn, Kurt Borusiewicz

References

1978 debut albums
Karen Young (American singer) albums